The Pop Media Award (called the Pop Press Award until 2007) is an award which aims to encourage Dutch pop journalism. Since 2004 the Pop Media Award is awarded on an annual basis during the European music conference and showcase festival Eurosonic Noorderslag in Groningen. The Pop Media Award is awarded for the entire oeuvre of a pop journalist, mainly taking into account the achievements of the past year. The award includes a gift of 2500 euro’s. The Pop Media Award is presented by Music Centre The Netherlands.

Winners 
 2014 - Atze de Vrieze
 2013 - Mary Go Wild / Mark van Bergen 
 2012 - Saul van Stapele
 2011 - DWDD Recordings
 2010 - Eric Corton
 2009 - Sander Donkers
 2008 - Jan van der Plas
 2007 - Leo Blokhuis
 2006 - John Schoorl
 2005 - Leon Verdonschot
 2004 - Lex van Rossen
 2003 - Hester Carvalho
 2002 - 3voor12
 2001 - Gijsbert Kamer
 2000 - Anton Corbijn
 1999 - Herman van der Horst
 1998 - Tom Engelshoven
 1997 - Martin Bril
 1996 - David Kleijwegt
 1995 - Jip Golsteijn
 1994 - Bert van de Kamp

References

External links
 Website Music Centre The Netherlands
 Website Eurosonic Noorderslag

Journalism awards